The 3 arrondissements of the Val-de-Marne department are:
 Arrondissement of Créteil, (prefecture of the Val-de-Marne department: Créteil) with 16 communes.  The population of the arrondissement was 310,758 in 2016.
 Arrondissement of L'Haÿ-les-Roses, (subprefecture: L'Haÿ-les-Roses) with 13 communes.  The population of the arrondissement was 508,854 in 2016.
 Arrondissement of Nogent-sur-Marne, (subprefecture: Nogent-sur-Marne) with 18 communes.  The population of the arrondissement was 558,539 in 2016.

History

As parts of the department Seine, the arrondissement of Créteil was established in 1964, and the arrondissement of Nogent-sur-Marne in 1966. In 1968 the department Val-de-Marne was created from parts of the former departments Seine and Seine-et-Oise, and the arrondissements of Créteil and Nogent-sur-Marne became part of it. The arrondissement of L'Haÿ-les-Roses was created in January 1973.

The borders of the arrondissements of Val-de-Marne were modified in February 2017:
 eight communes from the arrondissement of Créteil to the arrondissement of L'Haÿ-les-Roses
 two communes from the arrondissement of Créteil to the arrondissement of Nogent-sur-Marne
 three communes from the arrondissement of Nogent-sur-Marne to the arrondissement of Créteil

References

Val-de-Marne